The Westrail ADP/ADQ class is a class of railcars built by Comeng, Bassendean for Westrail in 1987 to operate the Australind service between Perth and Bunbury. Operation and ownership of the fleet was transferred to Transwa when Westrail was superseded by Transwa in 2003.

History 
In August 1985, Westrail awarded Comeng, Bassendean a contract for five diesel railcars, three ADP carriages with driving cabs and two ADQ trailer carriages, using a similar body shell and interior fitout to the New South Wales XPT carriages. Each carriage was powered by a Cummins KTA19 engine coupled to a Voith transmission. They usually operate as a four carriage set.

In July 2003, the railcars were painted in a new livery in line with the formation of Transwa. In 2007, the railcars were painted white as part of a refurbishment program. In 2010-2011 new seats were fitted.

They are scheduled to be replaced by six Alstom built railcars in 2022.

References

External links 

Perth Trains gallery

Diesel multiple units of Western Australia
Train-related introductions in 1987